is a railway station in Onomichi, Hiroshima Prefecture, Japan, operated by West Japan Railway Company (JR West).

Lines
Onomichi Station is served by the San'yō Main Line.

Ferry and waterbus
Port for riding on Ferry is located due south Onomichi Station
※In this section, there are regular routes of waterbus.

See also
 List of railway stations in Japan

External links

  

Railway stations in Hiroshima Prefecture
Sanyō Main Line
Railway stations in Japan opened in 1891